The 14505 / 14506 Amritsar–Nangal Dam Express is an Express train belonging to Northern Railway zone that runs between  and  in India. It is currently being operated with 14505/14506 train numbers on a daily basis.

Service

The 14505/Amritsar–Nangal Dam Express has an average speed of 50 km/hr and covers 287 km in 5h 45m. The 14506/Nangal Dam–Amritsar Express has an average speed of 48 km/hr and covers 287 km in 5h 55m.

Route & Halts 

The important halts of the train are:

Coach composition

The train has standard ICF rakes with max speed of 110 kmph. The train consists of 10 coaches:

 8 General Unreserved
 2 Seating cum Luggage Rake

Traction

Both trains are hauled by a Ghaziabad Loco Shed-based WAP-7 electric locomotive from Amritsar to Nangal Dam and vice versa.

See also 

 Amritsar Junction railway station
 Nangal Dam railway station
 Ambala–Amb Andaura DEMU

Notes

References

External links 

 14505/Amritsar - Nangal Dam Express
 14506/Nangal Dam - Amritsar Express

Transport in Amritsar
Express trains in India
Rail transport in Punjab, India
Railway services introduced in 2015